The 1987 Asian Women's Volleyball Championship was the fourth edition of the Asian Championship, a quadrennial international volleyball tournament organised by 
the Asian Volleyball Confederation (AVC) with Chinese Volleyball Association (CVA). The tournament was held in Shanghai, China from 6 to 14 June 1987.

Preliminary round

Pool A

|}

|}

Pool B

|}

|}

Final round

Classification 9th–11th

|}

|}

Classification 5th–8th

|}

|}

Championship

|}

|}

Final standing

References
Results (Archived 2009-05-08)

V
A
Asian women's volleyball championships
V
1987 in Chinese women's sport